Alexander Ziegler (8 March 1944 – in Zürich; 11 August 1987 in Zürich) was a Swiss author and actor.

Ziegler studied drama at the Max Reinhardt Seminar in Wien (1960/1961). He was an actor in Spring Awakening, a play by Frank Wedekind, in 1964. He was also an actor in the American television series Boys and Girls, created by Fred Mallow.

Openly gay, in 1966, he was imprisoned for two years because of his gay friendship with a 16-year-old named Stephan. While in prison, he wrote his first work, Labyrinth (1966). After he was released from prison, he worked as a journalist and author from 1971 to 1979 for the German gay magazine DU&ICH. He wrote many other articles and books.

In November 1977, his work Die Konsequenz was filmed and shown on German television. Actors in the film Die Konsequenz were Jürgen Prochnow as Martin Kurath and Ernst Hannawald as Thomas Manzoni.

Ziegler committed suicide, aged 43, in Zurich by overdosing on tranquilizers.

Works by Ziegler 
 Labyrinth, 1970
 Die Konsequenz, 1975
 Kein Recht auf Liebe, 1978
 Eines Mannes Liebe, 1980
 Gesellschaftsspiele, 1980
 Angstträume, 1981
 Die Zärtlichen, 1982
 Ich bekenne, 1985
 Halunkengelächter, 1985

References

External links 
 
 Films as actor in Internet Movie Database

1944 births
1987 suicides
Swiss screenwriters
Male screenwriters
Swiss LGBT writers
German gay writers
20th-century screenwriters
Drug-related suicides in Switzerland
1987 deaths
20th-century Swiss LGBT people